Henry Fischer may refer to:
Henry George Fischer (1923–2005), American Egyptologist
H. L. Fischer (Henry Lee Fischer, 1822–1909), Pennsylvania German language writer
Hank Fischer (Henry William Fischer, born 1940), baseball pitcher
Henry Fischer (footballer) (1880–1960), Australian footballer for Geelong Football Club
Henry P. Fischer (1843–1912), Republican legislator from Milwaukee, Wisconsin

See also

Henry Fisher (disambiguation)
Harry Otto Fischer (1910–1986), American science fiction writer